Siah Darreh-ye Olya (also Romanized as Sīāh Darreh-ye ‘Olyā; also known as Şayyād Darreh, Seyāh Darreh, and Sīāh Darreh) is a village in Khezel-e Sharqi Rural District, Khezel District, Nahavand County, Hamadan Province, Iran. At the 2006 census, its population was 81, in 19 families.

References 

Populated places in Nahavand County